A Queen for Caesar is a 1962 Italian-French historical drama film directed by Piero Pierotti and Victor Tourjansky and starring Pascale Petit, George Ardisson and Rik Battaglia. It is set in Egypt in 48 BC. Unlike other films about Caesar and Cleopatra, this film focuses entirely on the dynastic struggle within Egypt leading up to the arrival of Caesar, and in fact, we only see him in the closing scene of the film when he arrives at the Ptolemaic Palace in Alexandria.

This film was shot at the Incir De Paolis Studios in Rome. 20th Century Fox bought the rights for the film to keep it out of release lest it compete with their own Elizabeth Taylor Cleopatra.

Cast
Pascale Petit as Cleopatra
George Ardisson as Achillas
Rik Battaglia as Lucius Septimius
Akim Tamiroff as Gnaeus Pompeius
Gordon Scott as Julius Caesar
Corrado Pani as Ptolemy
Franco Volpi as Apollodoros
Ennio Balbo as Theodotos
Nerio Bernardi as Scaurus
Aurora de Alba as Rabis
Nando Angelini as Sextus Pompeius
Nino Marchetti as Pompey's messenger

See also
List of historical drama films
List of films set in ancient Rome
Cleopatra VII
Ptolemaic dynasty
History of Ptolemaic Egypt
1st century BC

Notes

External links
 

1962 films
Peplum films
Films directed by Victor Tourjansky
Films directed by Piero Pierotti
Films scored by Michel Michelet
Depictions of Cleopatra on film
Depictions of Julius Caesar on film
1960s Italian-language films
1960s historical drama films
French historical drama films
Italian historical drama films
Sword and sandal films
1960s Italian films
1960s French films